Miscavige (from the Polish name Myszkiewicz) is the surname of the following people:
David Miscavige (born 1960), leader of the Church of Scientology
Jenna Miscavige Hill (born 1984), American critic of Scientology, niece of David
Ron Miscavige (1936–2021), American musician, father of David
Ruthless: Scientology, My Son David Miscavige, and Me, a 2016 book by Ron
Shelly Miscavige (born 1961), American Scientologist, wife of David